The 2005 Monte Carlo Masters was a men's tennis tournament played on outdoor clay courts. It was the 99th edition of the event and was part of the ATP Masters Series of the 2005 ATP Tour. It took place at the Monte Carlo Country Club in Roquebrune-Cap-Martin, France from 11 April through 17 April 2005. The men's singles was headlined by world No. 1 Roger Federer, Marat Safin and Tim Henman.  Rafael Nadal won the singles title.

Finals

Singles

 Rafael Nadal defeated  Guillermo Coria, 6–3, 6–1, 0–6, 7–5

Doubles

 Leander Paes /  Nenad Zimonjić defeated  Bob Bryan /  Mike Bryan, walkover

References

External links
 
 ATP tournament profile
 ITF tournament edition details

 
Monte Carlo
Monte-Carlo Masters
2005 in Monégasque sport
Monte
Monte Carlo Masters